Miyaji may refer to
Miyaji (surname)
Miyaji Station, a railway station in Aso, Kumamoto, Japan
 8303 Miyaji, a minor planet